Martin Brendan Birrane (19 August 1935 – 9 June 2018) was an Irish businessman and former racing driver. Born in Ballina, County Mayo and educated at St Muredach's College, Birrane made his money in property development, with his company Peer Group.

He was the owner of the Mondello Park racetrack in County Kildare, which is the only FIA 3 1/2 kilometre track in Ireland. It hosts domestic and international events.

He competed in the Le Mans 24 Hours ten times as a driver, winning the GT class in 1985.

Birrane owned Team Ireland, a NASCAR Winston Cup Series car racing team from 1991 to 1992. He was the owner of racing car manufacturer Lola Cars from 1997 until the company was closed down in 2012. The Sunday Times Rich List 2011 valued his assets at €85 million.

Birrane died in June 2018 at the age of 82.

Racing record

Complete British Saloon Car Championship results
(key) (Races in bold indicate pole position; races in italics indicate fastest lap.)

† Events with 2 races staged for the different classes.

Complete World Sportscar Championship results
(key) (Races in bold indicate pole position) (Races in italics indicate fastest lap)

Footnotes

Complete European F5000 Championship results
(key) (Races in bold indicate pole position; races in italics indicate fastest lap.)

Complete Shellsport International Series results
(key) (Races in bold indicate pole position; races in italics indicate fastest lap)

24 Hours of Le Mans results

References

External links
 
 

1935 births
2018 deaths
20th-century Irish businesspeople
24 Hours of Le Mans drivers
British Touring Car Championship drivers
Irish racing drivers
World Sportscar Championship drivers
People from Ballina, County Mayo